Toppy is the name given to seven cloned Labrador Retriever dogs, born in late 2007 to three surrogate mothers. They were the world's first cloned working dogs, and were used by the Korea Customs Service.

Each Toppy is a clone of a successful sniffer dog in Canada. The Toppy dogs needed 16 months of training to qualify to work for the South Korean Customs Service. Only 10-15% of  dogs are genetically predisposed to being effective detection dogs.

The project cost ₩300 million (about US$240,000), and was funded by the Government of South Korea; it was  led by Lee Byeong-chun, a former aide to Hwang Woo-suk, who fell from grace after his stem cell research turned out to be fabricated.

See also
Snuppy
Hwang Woo-suk

References 

2007 animal births
Cloned dogs
Dog breeding
Science and technology in South Korea